James L. Barnard is a South African born engineer living in the United States who is known globally as the pioneer of biological nutrient remover, a non-chemical means of water treatment to remove nitrogen and phosphorus from used water.

Barnard was elected as a member into the National Academy of Engineering in 2021 for the development and implementation of biological nutrient removal in water treatment.

Biography 

Barnard is recognized internationally for developing the BARDENPHO Process (BARnard DENitrification and PHOsphorus removal), Phoredox (later AO and A2O), the Modified Balakrishnan/Eckenfelder (later called the MLE) process and the Westbank Process.  He is currently employed as Global Practice and Technology Leader by Black & Veatch in Kansas City, MO USA.

Barnard has done process design for more than 140 nutrient removal plants and extensions around the world and introduced BNR to North America with the design of the Palmetto plant in Florida and the Kelowna plant in British Columbia for nitrogen and phosphorus removal. Most designs for high efficiency nitrogen removal in the USA are now based on these models.

He served as External Examiner for Ph.D. candidates from the Universities of Cape Town, Pretoria, British Columbia, Queensland, Manitoba, Purdue and Stavanger in Norway.  He also served as adjunct professor at the University of British Columbia and taught courses in biological nutrient removal at the University of Queensland Winter School for ten consecutive years.

Education 
 B.Sc. B.Ing. University of Stellenbosch, South Africa, 1956
 B.Sc. (Eng) (Hon) University of Pretoria, South Africa, 1967
 M.S. Environmental Eng. University of Texas Austin, 1969
 Ph.D. Vanderbilt University, 1971

Awards and accolades 

Barnard's research has featured in 60 international publications. He was awarded the Camp Medal from the Water Environment Federation (WEF), the Imhoff/Koch award of the International Water Association and the Clarke Prize of the National Water Research Institute.  He has been elected as a Distinguished Member of the American Society of Civil Engineers, A Fellow of WEF and was the recipient of the Lee Kuan Yew Water Prize at Singapore International Water Week in 2011. Barnard has been awarded Honorary Doctorates from the University of Johannesburg, Stellenbosch University and the Iowa State University. He is a member of the Distinguished Group of Professionals of the International Water Association and has received a Gold Medal from the South African Academy of Science and Arts. Barnard is also a member of the National Academy of Engineering (2021).

References 

http://bv.com/Home/news/solutions/water/father-of-bnr-continues-his-pursuit-of-improved-water-treatment 
http://www.caee.utexas.edu/alumni/academy/49-alumni/academy/125-barnard

Living people
South African engineers
University of Pretoria alumni
Stellenbosch University alumni
Cockrell School of Engineering alumni
Vanderbilt University alumni
University of British Columbia alumni
Year of birth missing (living people)